The A601(M) was a motorway in Carnforth, Lancashire, England. The A601(M) was not the A601 under motorway restrictions, as is the usual explanation for such a classification in the UK.

The motorway had a dual carriageway section leading north from Junction 35 of the M6, and until 2020 had a single carriageway section leading south, where it terminated at a T junction on a B road.

History
The section between the M6 and junction 35A was originally opened in 1960, as part of the Lancaster Bypass. This was a two-lane motorway. In 1970, the M6 was extended north, and a short spur was left to the A6. The terminal roundabout was given the junction number 35A. Plans existed to extend this as part of an Arnside link road, which would have connected the Furness Peninsula with the M6, but they were scrapped for environmental reasons, but parts of this road exist today, along the A590.

In 1987, a link was constructed with the B6254, to remove traffic for Over Kellet Quarries and Kirkby Lonsdale passing through Carnforth. The road was then renumbered as the A601(M). No junction number was given to this terminus.

In early 2020 the link road was downgraded to become the B6601 road, and in late 2021, Lancashire County Council issued a revocation scheme for the remaining portion of the motorway to be downgraded to non-motorway status. The revocation scheme was approved by the Secretary of State on 7 February 2023, and came into force that day.

Junctions

See also
List of motorways in the United Kingdom
Great Britain road numbering scheme

References

External links

Pathetic Motorways – A601(M)

Motorways in England
Roads in Lancashire
Two-lane expressways